Rodney Jones (born August 30, 1956) is an American jazz guitarist who worked with Jaki Byard, Chico Hamilton, Dizzy Gillespie, and Lena Horne and as a bandleader. He is cited as a jazz guitarist who uses modern quartal harmony. Jones is a faculty member at Juilliard.

Discography
Credits adapted from AllMusic and Bandcamp.

As leader
 The Liberation of Contemporary Jazz Guitar (Strata-East, 1977)
 Articulation (Timeless, 1978)
 When You Feel the Love (Timeless, 1981)
 Friends (1981)
 My Funny Valentine (Timeless, 1983)
 The Unspoken Heart (Minor Music, 1992)
 The "X" Field (MusicMasters, 1996)
 Right Now (Minor Music, 1996)
 The Undiscovered Few (Blue Note, 1999)
 Soul Manifesto (Blue Note, 2001)
 Soul Manifesto Live! (Savant, 2003)
 Dreams and Stories (Savant, 2005)
 A Thousand Small Things (18th & Vine, 2009)

As sideman
With Ruth Brown
 Blues On Broadway (Fantasy, 1989)
 Fine and Mellow (Fantasy, 1992)
 The Songs of My Life (Victor, 1993)
 R+B=Ruth Brown (Bullseye Blues, 1997)

With Lena Horne
 We'll Be Together Again (Blue Note, 1994)
 An Evening with (Blue Note, 1995)
 Being Myself (Blue Note, 1998)

With Jimmy McGriff
 You Ought to Think About Me (Headfirst, 1990)
 Right Turn On Blue (Telarc, 1994)
 McGriff's Blues (K-Tel, 1994)
 Straight Up (Milestone, 1998)
 McGriff's House Party (Milestone, 2000)
 McGriff Avenue (Milestone, 2002)

With Maceo Parker
 Roots Revisited (Minor Music, 1990)
 Mo' Roots (Verve, 1991)
 Life on Planet Groove (Minor Music, 1992)
 Southern Exposure (Minor Music, 1993)

With Lucky Peterson
 Organ Soul Sessions: Brother Where Are You? (Universal/EmArcy, 2009)
 Organ Soul Sessions: Mercy (Universal/EmArcy, 2009)
 Organ Soul Sessions: The Music Is the Magic (Universal/EmArcy, 2009)
 Organ Soul Sessions (Universal/EmArcy, 2009)

With others
 Carl Allen & Rodney Whitaker, Get Ready (Mack Avenue, 2007)
 Carl Allen & Rodney Whitaker, Work to Do (Mack Avenue, 2009)
 Ernestine Anderson, Love Makes the Changes (HighNote, 2003)
 Victor Bailey, Bottom's Up (Atlantic, 1989)
 Hamiet Bluiett, Makin' Whoopee (Mapleshade, 1997)
 Ray Brown, Blues for Jazzo (Prevue, 1998)
 Ray Brown, Moonlight in Vermont (Prevue, 1998)
 Kenny Burrell, Generation (Blue Note, 1987)
 Kenny Burrell, Pieces of Blue and the Blues (Blue Note, 1988)
 Ann Hampton Callaway, Signature (N-Coded Music, 2002)
 James Carter, Present Tense (EmArcy, 2008)
 Regina Carter, Rhythms of the Heart (Verve, 1999)
 Keyshia Cole, 11:11 Reset (Epic, 2017)
 Larry Coryell, Sketches of Coryell (Shanachie, 1996)
 Noah Creshevsky, The Twilight of the Gods (Tzadik, 2010)
 Noah Creshevsky, The Four Seasons (Tzadik, 2013)
 Charles Earland, Coming to You Live (Columbia, 1980)
 Eliane Elias, Everything I Love (Blue Note, 1999)
 Pee Wee Ellis, Sepia Tonality (Minor Music, 1994)
 Dizzy Gillespie, Dizzy's Party (Pablo, 1976)
 Chico Hamilton, Chico Hamilton and the Players (Blue Note, 1976)
 Donald Harrison, Free to Be (Impulse!, 1999)
 Vincent Herring, American Experience (MusicMasters, 1990)
 Jennifer Holliday, The Song Is You (Shanachie, 2013)
 Dave Koz, At the Movies (Capitol, 2007)
 Carmen Lundy, Night and Day (CBS/Sony, 1987)
 Gloria Lynne, This One's On Me (HighNote, 1998)
 Christian McBride, Bringin' It (Mack Avenue, 2017)
 Houston Person, The Opening Round (Savant, 1997)
 Houston Person, I'm Just a Lucky So and So (HighNote, 2019)
 Irene Reid, Movin' Out (Savant, 2003)
 Irene Reid, Thanks to You (Savant, 2004)
 Hilton Ruiz, El Camino (Novus, 1988)
 Hilton Ruiz, Strut (Novus, 1989)
 Lonnie Smith, Too Damn Hot (Palmetto, 2004)
 Billy Strayhorn, Lush Life (Blue Note, 2007)
 Akira Tana, Secret Agent Men (Sons of Sound, 2002)
 Frankie Valli, Romancing the '60s (Universal Motown, 2007)
 Fred Wesley, Comme Ci Comme Ca (Minor Music, 1991)
 Reuben Wilson, Azure Te (18th & Vine, 2009)

Further reading

References

External links

American jazz guitarists
Living people
1956 births
Musicians from New Haven, Connecticut
Strata-East Records artists
Timeless Records artists
Blue Note Records artists
City College of New York alumni
Juilliard School faculty
20th-century American guitarists
Jazz musicians from Connecticut